Königsberger Klopse, also known as Soßklopse are a German specialty of meatballs in a creamy white sauce with capers.

Name
The dish is named for the former German city of Königsberg (now Kaliningrad, Russia), and is one of the highlights of historical East Prussian cuisine. In the German Democratic Republic (GDR), the dish was officially called Kochklopse ("boiled meatballs") to avoid any reference to its namesake city, which in the aftermath of World War II had been annexed by the Soviet Union. The city's German inhabitants had been expelled, and the city had been repopulated with Russians and other Soviet citizens and renamed after Mikhail Kalinin, a close ally of Joseph Stalin in the Soviet leadership. Königsberger Klopse were  jokingly referred to as Revanchistenklopse.
Königsberger Klopse are still a popular dish in present-day Germany.

Preparation
The meatballs are made from very finely minced veal, though less expensive beef or pork is often substituted, along with onions, eggs, a few (white) bread crumbs, and spices, chiefly white pepper. The traditional recipe uses anchovy. If  herring is substituted, the dish is called Rostocker Klopse. If both anchovy and herring are omitted, it may be generically called Soßklopse (sauced meatballs).

The meatballs are carefully simmered in salt water, and the resulting broth is mixed with roux, cream, and egg yolk to which capers are added. A simpler version of the recipe thickens the sauce with flour or starch only, omitting the egg yolk. A refined version uses only egg yolk as a thickener. Capers are an essential ingredient in all these versions.

The dish is traditionally served with beetroot and boiled potatoes or, less often, with rice.

See also 
 East Prussian dishes
 List of meatball dishes

References 

East Prussian cuisine
German cuisine
Klopse
Meatballs
Anchovy dishes